Dhoop Chhaon is a 1977 Hindi film. Directed and written by Prahlad Sharma, the film stars Sanjeev Kumar, Hema Malini, Yogeeta Bali, Om Shivpuri, Nazir Hussain, Gajanan Jagirdar, Dinesh Hingoo and Yunus Parvez. The film's music is by  Shankar–Jaikishan and Lyrics by Kaifi Azmi, Vithalbhai Patel, Vishveshwar Sharma, Virendra Mishra. Screenplay of the movie is co-written by U.B. Mathur.

Hema Malini plays the part of a woman who is forced into prostitution after going blind.

Plot 
Dr. D.D. Sinha solicits a number from conspicuous specialists to go to far off rustic town in India and treat the weak and keep the infection from spreading. Dr. Paras, who is a trainee of Dr. D.D. Sinha, is set up to go there. Dr. Paras goes there, works with local people to thwart the disease and treats the feeble, and is successful in preventing it's spreading to various organizations. He meets with town magnificence, Lajwanti pen name, and both start to look all idealistic at each other. Paras promises to return and marry her. Lajjo foresees his return, anyway he doesn't reestablish, the residents affront her, beat her senseless, she loses her vision, is grabbed and sold into prostitution. By then one day she gets an amazing ally, none other Dr. Paras, who is as of now associated with to Dr. Sinha's daughter, sensory system pro Manju, and should help Lajjo's sight is returning. The request is will Lajjo recognize any help from a man who deceived her, and is genuinely liable for her present issue.

Cast 
 Sanjeev Kumar as Dr. Paras
 Hema Malini as Lajwanti a.k.a. lajjo
 Yogeeta Bali as Dr. Manju Sinha
 Om Shivpuri as Dr. D.D. Sinha
 Nazir Hussain as Choudhary
 Gajanan Jagirdar as Abdul
 Dinesh Hingoo as Totaram
 Badri Prasad as Pandit
 Shaukat Azmi as Pandit's Wife
 Yunus Parvez as Pandit's servant

Soundtrack

References

External links 
 

1970s Hindi-language films